Aleena is a female given name, a variant of Alina. It may refer to:

People
 Aleena Gibson (born 1968), Swedish songwriter

In fiction 
Queen Aleena the Hedgehog, a character from the animated series Sonic Underground; mother of Sonic the Hedgehog
Aleena (Star Wars), an alien species from the Star Wars universe

See also 
Alena (disambiguation)

Feminine given names